Dongshi District (Pha̍k-fa-sṳ: Tûng-sṳ) is a suburban district in eastern Taichung, Republic of China (Taiwan). It is the third largest district by area in Taichung City after Heping District and Taiping District. A majority of the residents are Hakka, making it an enclave in an otherwise non-Hakka county. Its Hakka dialect is very distinct compared to the dialects of other counties.

Dongshi is situated on a narrow, north–south oriented plain, flanked by the Dajia River to the west and the Xueshan Range to the east. It is this sense of being pressed up against that ridge, at the easternmost edge of the large west-central plain, that gives the town its name. Its elevation ranges from about 330 meters along the Dajia River to 1201 meters in the foothills of the Central Mountain Range.

The township is bounded by (clockwise from the north) Zhuolan, Heping, Xinshe, Shigang, Fengyuan, Houli, and Sanyi.

History

After the handover of Taiwan from Japan to the Republic of China in 1945, Dongshi was organized as an urban township of Taichung County. On 25 December 2010, Taichung County was merged with Taichung City and Dongshi was upgraded to a district of the city. Buildings in Dongshi were severely damaged by the Chi-Chi earthquake in 1999.

Administrative divisions 
Dongshi is divided into 25 villages , which are Beixing, Zhongning, Tungan , Nanping, Yanping, Shangxin, Guangxing, Taichang, Zhongke, Fulong, Longxing, Xincheng, Yifu, Shangcheng, Xiacheng, Qingdong, Qingfu, Tungxin, Yuening, Xiaxin, Xinglong, Maoxing, Taixing, Beitou and Mingzheng.

Famous features 
Dongshi includes some greenspace and significant farmland; largely orchards. Dongshi is known for its pears, which are large and almost spherical with a thin, light yellowish-brown rugose skin. In a good year, their flavor is excellent. Intensive topwork at the start of each season involves grafting Japanese pear bud slips to the tree stock.

The old train station has been converted into the Dongshih Hakka Cultural Park. Historical Hakka cultural artefacts along with modern works of art are on display. This area also marks the eastern terminus of the Dongshih-Fongyuan Bicycle Greenway (東豐自行車綠廊.) This greenway was converted from a former railway track. The town is also noted for two large forest parks in the mountainous eastern parts of the county. Dongshi Forest Park (東勢林場) and Sijiaolin (四角林林場) are managed by the Changhua County and Taichung City Agricultural Committees respectively.

Native products 
 Persimmon
 Pear

Tourist attractions 
 Dongshi Forestry Culture Park
 Fuxing Suspension Bridge
 Shihgang Dam
 Dongshi Forest Garden
 Dongshi Hakka Cultural Park

Transportation
Dongshi is served by Provincial Highway 8, known as the Central Cross-Island Highway, Provincial Highway 3, and Taichung Special Route 1, which leads to the Daxueshan National Forest Recreation Area.

Notable natives 
 Chan Hao-ching, tennis athlete
 Latisha Chan, tennis athlete
 Shyu Jong-shyong, Deputy Secretary-General of Executive Yuan (2015–2016)

See also 
 Taichung

References 

 
 

Districts of Taichung